The Babor Range is a mountain range of the Tell Atlas in Algeria. The highest point of the range is 2,004 m high Mount Babor.

The Babor Range, together with the neighboring Bibans, is part of the mountainous natural region of Petite Kabylie.

Ecology
There is a protected area in the range, the Djebel Babor Nature Reserve, known for birdwatching. It is also one of the few remaining habitats for the endangered Barbary macaque, Macaca sylvanus.

Features

See also
List of mountains in Algeria
Petite Kabylie
 Tell Atlas

References

External links
 African Birding Resources (2008) Algeria: Hotspots
 C. Michael Hogan, (2008) Barbary Macaque: Macaca sylvanus, Globaltwitcher.com, ed. N. Strõmberg

Mountain ranges of Algeria